In mathematical measure theory, for every positive integer  the ham sandwich theorem states that given  measurable "objects" in -dimensional Euclidean space, it is possible to divide each one of them in half (with respect to their measure, e.g. volume) with a single -dimensional hyperplane. This is even possible if the objects overlap.

It was proposed by Hugo Steinhaus and proved by Stefan Banach (explicitly in dimension 3, without taking the trouble to state the theorem in the -dimensional case), and also years later called the Stone–Tukey theorem after Arthur H. Stone and John Tukey.

Naming

The ham sandwich theorem takes its name from the case when  and the three objects to be bisected are the ingredients of a ham sandwich. Sources differ on whether these three ingredients are two slices of bread and a piece of ham , bread and cheese and ham , or bread and butter and ham . In two dimensions, the theorem is known as the pancake theorem to refer to the flat nature of the two objects to be bisected by a line .

History
Beyer and Zardecki's paper includes a translation of this note, which attributes the posing of the problem to Hugo Steinhaus, and credits Stefan Banach as the first to solve the problem, by a reduction to the Borsuk–Ulam theorem. The note poses the problem in two ways: first, formally, as "Is it always possible to bisect three solids, arbitrarily located, with the aid of an appropriate plane?" and second, informally, as "Can we place a piece of ham under a meat cutter so that meat, bone, and fat are cut in halves?" The note then offers a proof of the theorem.

This paper proves the -dimensional version of the theorem in a more general setting involving measures. The paper attributes the  case to Stanislaw Ulam, based on information from a referee; but  claim that this is incorrect, given the note mentioned above, although "Ulam did make a fundamental contribution in proposing" the Borsuk–Ulam theorem.

Two-dimensional variant: proof using a rotating-knife
The two-dimensional variant of the theorem (also known as the pancake theorem) can be proved by an argument which appears in the fair cake-cutting literature (see e.g. Robertson–Webb rotating-knife procedure).

For each angle , we can bisect pancake #1 using a straight line ("knife") of angle . It is possible that an entire range of translations of our line yield a fraction of 1/2; in this case, we make a canonical choice by picking the middle one of all such translations.

When the knife is at angle 0, it also cuts pancake #2, but the pieces are probably unequal (if we are lucky and the pieces are equal, we are done). Define the 'positive' side of the knife as the side in which the fraction of pancake #2 is larger. We now turn the knife, and translate it as described above. Initially . The function  is continuous, since small changes in the angle lead to small changes in the position of the knife.

When the knife is at angle 180, the knife is upside-down, so  . Cutting at that angle bisects both pancakes simultaneously.

n-dimensional variant: proof using the Borsuk–Ulam theorem

The ham sandwich theorem can be proved as follows using the Borsuk–Ulam theorem.  This proof follows the one described by Steinhaus and others (1938), attributed there to Stefan Banach, for the  case. In the field of Equivariant topology, this proof would fall under the configuration-space/tests-map paradigm.

Let  denote the  objects that we wish to simultaneously bisect. Let  be the unit -sphere embedded in -dimensional Euclidean space , centered at the origin.

Now we define a function  from the -sphere  to -dimensional Euclidean space  as follows:
This function  is continuous (which, in a formal proof, would need some justification). Antipodal points  and  correspond to hyperplanes  and  that are equal except that they have opposite positive sides.

Measure theoretic versions

In measure theory,  proved two more general forms of the ham sandwich theorem.  Both versions concern the bisection of  subsets  of a common set , where  has a Carathéodory outer measure and each  has finite outer measure.

The proof is again a reduction to the Borsuk-Ulam theorem. This theorem generalizes the standard ham sandwich theorem by letting .

Discrete and computational geometry versions

In discrete geometry and computational geometry, the ham sandwich theorem usually refers to the special case in which each of the sets being divided is a finite set of points.  Here the relevant measure is the counting measure, which simply counts the number of points on either side of the hyperplane.  In two dimensions, the theorem can be stated as follows:

For a finite set of points in the plane, each colored "red" or "blue", there is a line that simultaneously bisects the red points and bisects the blue points, that is, the number of red points on either side of the line is equal and the number of blue points on either side of the line is equal.

There is an exceptional case when points lie on the line.  In this situation, we count each of these points as either being on one side, on the other, or on neither side of the line (possibly depending on the point), i.e. "bisecting" in fact means that each side contains less than half of the total number of points.  This exceptional case is actually required for the theorem to hold, of course when the number of red points or the number of blue is odd, but also in specific configurations with even numbers of points, for instance when all the points lie on the same line and the two colors are separated from each other (i.e. colors don't alternate along the line). A situation where the numbers of points on each side cannot match each other is provided by adding an extra point out of the line in the previous configuration.

In computational geometry, this ham sandwich theorem leads to a computational problem, the ham sandwich problem. In two dimensions, the problem is this: given a finite set of  points in the plane, each colored "red" or "blue", find a ham sandwich cut for them. First,  described an algorithm for the special, separated case. Here all red points are on one side of some line and all blue points are on the other side, a situation where there is a unique ham sandwich cut, which Megiddo could find in linear time. Finally,  found an optimal -time algorithm. Given  sets of points in general position in -dimensional space, the algorithm computes a -dimensional hyperplane that has an equal number of points of each of the sets in both of its half-spaces, i.e., a ham-sandwich cut for the given points. If  is a part of the input, then no polynomial time algorithm is expected to exist, as if the points are on a moment curve, the problem becomes equivalent to necklace splitting, which is PPA-complete.

A linear-time algorithm that area-bisects two disjoint convex polygons
is described by
.

Generalizations
The original theorem works for at most  collections, where  is the number of dimensions. If we want to bisect a larger number of collections without going to higher dimensions, we can use, instead of a hyperplane, an algebraic surface of degree , i.e., an –dimensional surface defined by a polynomial function of degree :

Given  measures in an –dimensional space, there exists an algebraic surface of degree  which bisects them all..

This generalization is proved by mapping the –dimensional plane into a  dimensional plane, and then applying the original theorem.

.

See also 
 Exact division

References
.
.

.
.
.
.
.

.
.
.

External links
 
ham sandwich theorem on the Earliest known uses of some of the words of mathematics 
Ham Sandwich Cuts by Danielle MacNevin
An interactive 2D demonstration

Theorems in measure theory
Articles containing proofs
Theorems in topology